The white-crested helmetshrike (Prionops plumatus), also known as the white helmetshrike, is a species of passerine bird in the Vanga family Vangidae, formerly usually included in the Malaconotidae.

Distribution and habitat
It is found in Angola, Benin, Botswana, Burkina Faso, Burundi, Cameroon, Central African Republic, Chad, Democratic Republic of the Congo, Ivory Coast, Eritrea, Eswatini, Ethiopia, Gambia, Ghana, Guinea, Guinea-Bissau, Kenya, Malawi, Mali, Mauritania, Mozambique, Namibia, Niger, Nigeria, Rwanda, Senegal, Sierra Leone, Somalia, South Africa, Sudan, Tanzania, Togo, Uganda, Zambia, and Zimbabwe.
Its natural habitats are subtropical or tropical dry forests, dry savanna, moist savanna, and subtropical or tropical dry shrubland.

Behaviour
It is a gregarious bird and is found in small, active parties that are always on the move as they forage among the foliage or on the ground. They chatter noisily to one another as they move through their territory.

Gallery

References

External links
 (White-crested helmetshrike = ) White helmetshrike - Species text in The Atlas of Southern African Birds.

white-crested helmetshrike
Birds of Sub-Saharan Africa
white-crested helmetshrike
Taxonomy articles created by Polbot
Taxa named by George Shaw